Gipple's Quarry Bridge is a historic structure located in a rural area southwest of Columbus Junction, Iowa, United States. The Louisa County Board of Supervisors approved the petition of T.J. Gipple in April 1893 to replace a timber pile bridge over Buffington Creek, which was near his stone quarry. They awarded a $1,174 contract to the Gillette-Herzog Manufacturing Company of Minneapolis to build two bridges. The second span was the County Line Bridge over Long Creek in Columbus Township. The bridge span is supported by stone masonry abutments and piers. The steel components of the bridge were rolled by Carnegie, Gillette-Herzog in Pittsburgh. The pony truss bridge is typical of those built in the same era in Iowa, however, like County Line Bridge it has an unusual lower chord configuration with end panels that slope downward from the bearing shoes to the center panels. It has subsequently been abandoned. The bridge was listed on the National Register of Historic Places in 1998.

References

Bridges completed in 1893
National Register of Historic Places in Louisa County, Iowa
Road bridges on the National Register of Historic Places in Iowa
Truss bridges in Iowa
Steel bridges in the United States
Buildings and structures in Louisa County, Iowa